The 2007 Hong Kong District Council elections were held on 18 November 2007. Elections were held to all 18 districts of Hong Kong, returned 405 members from directly elected constituencies out of total 534 councils member. A total number of 886 candidates contesting in 364 seats, while 41 seats were uncontested. A total number of 1.4 million voters cast their ballots, consisting 38% of the electorate, significantly lower than the  last elections in 2003.

The pro-Beijing flagship party Democratic Alliance for the Betterment and Progress of Hong Kong (DAB) received the largest victory in its history, rebounding their loss from the 2003 with extra gain, taking total number of 115 seats, compared to 62 seats in the 2003 elections. The pan-democrats suffered a devastating loss, with its  electoral coalition winning only about a hundred seats out of almost 300 candidates. The pro-democracy flagship party Democratic Party was beaten in every region especially in Kowloon, losing almost half of the seats as compared to the 2003 elections.

As a result, the pan-democrats lost control of their two traditional strongholds, Sham Shui Po and Kwai Tsing with the help of the pro-government members appointed by Chief Executive Donald Tsang to the District Councils.

Contesting parties

Parties
In September 2007, the pan-democrats announced their plan to field 289 candidates in the election, including 138 incumbents and 136 newcomers after a process of coordination initiated by the Power for Democracy under the banner of Democratic Coalition for DC Election. After the coordination, the number constituencies with more than one pro-democratic candidates reduced from 30 to 7. The pan-democrats demanded universal suffrage and abolition of the appointed seat in the District Councils as the election platform.

The Democratic Party, the flagship pro-democratic party fielded 114 candidates, Civic Party 41, Hong Kong Association for Democracy and People's Livelihood (ADPL) 38, League of Social Democrats 28, The Frontier 15, as well as Democratic Alliance, Civic Act-up, Hong Kong Confederation of Trade Unions (CTU), Neighbourhood and Worker's Service Centre (NWSC) and the others.

The Civic Party, derived from the Article 45 Concern Group established after the 2003 July 1 protests was a relatively new party without much resources and district network with only 7 incumbent district councillors. The party fielded around 42 candidates in constituencies where the pan-democrats had not contested with its new image to appeal to the voters. Another new founded League of Social Democrats fielded about 30 candidates in lower-income areas such as Wong Tai Sin, Kwun Tong and Tsuen Wan, seeking to appeal to the lower class voters.

The thinktank Savantas Policy Institute set up by former Secretary for Security Regina Ip also fielded four candidates with independent affiliation in the election, including two retired civil servant and a former administrative officer.

Candidates
A historic record of 917 nominations were received since the handover of Hong Kong. 39 of the 405 seats received only one nomination thus were returned uncontestedly, of which 12 of them were taken by the Democratic Alliance for the Betterment and Progress of Hong Kong (DAB), 2 by Liberal Party and 1 by the Democratic Party.

Cyd Ho, the incumbent district councillor who beat DAB's Ip Kwok-him in his own constituency Kwun Lung in 2003, did not seek for re-election. Ip faced challenged by activist Ho Loy. Two Civic Party rising stars, barrister Tanya Chan and Tsang Kwok-fung challenged incumbent Peak district councillor Lam Man-kit of the Liberal Party and DAB legislator Li Kwok-ying in Tai Po Market. Priscilla Leung, a pro-Beijing assistant professor of law at the City University of Hong Kong also ran in the election, challenging Democrat Chan Ka-wai in Whampoa East.

Pre-election events
On 15 November, two days before the election, Ko Keung-wah, a village representative of Shung Ching San Tsuen in Yuen Long and an assistant to the Liberal Party candidate Philip Wong Pak-yan in Shap Pat Heung North and Lam Tim-fook in Shap Pat Heung South, was attacked. Ko got a finger on his right hand was chopped off and suffered at least four deep slice wounds to his back and one to his abdomen. Anti-triad officers said the attack might be linked with the election. On the election day, a triad member was spotted campaigning for an independent candidate in Shap Pat Heung North influential rural leader Leung Fuk-yuen.

Results

|-
! style="background-color:#E9E9E9;text-align:center;" colspan=3 |Political Affiliation
! style="background-color:#E9E9E9;text-align:right;" |Popular vote
! style="background-color:#E9E9E9;text-align:right;" |%
! style="background-color:#E9E9E9;text-align:right;" |%±
! style="background-color:#E9E9E9;text-align:right;" |Standing
! style="background-color:#E9E9E9;text-align:right;" |Elected
! style="background-color:#E9E9E9;text-align:right;" |±
|-
| style="background-color:pink;border-bottom-style:hidden;" rowspan="11" |
| width=1px style="background-color: " |
| style="text-align:left;" |Democratic Alliance for the Betterment and Progress of Hong Kong
|  292,916 || 25.73 || 2.79 || 178 || 115 || 40
|-
| width=1px style="background-color: " |
| style="text-align:left;" |Civil Force
|  30,880 || 2.71 || 0.27 || 20 || 18 || 3
|-
| width=1px style="background-color: " |
| style="text-align:left;" |Liberal Party
|  50,026 || 4.39 || 1.63 || 55 || 14 || 3
|-
|style="background-color: "|
| style="text-align:left;" | Hong Kong Federation of Trade Unions
|  4,208 || 0.37 || 0.11 || 3|| 1 || 1
|-
|style="background-color: #FF6503"|
| style="text-align:left;" | Tseung Kwan O Residents' Association
|  1,922 || 0.17 || - || 1 || 1 || -
|-
|style="background-color: #9B28E9"|
| style="text-align:left;" | Tin Shui Wai Women Association
| 1,457 || 0.13 || - || 1 || 1 || -
|-
|style="background-color: "|
| style="text-align:left;" | Federation of Hong Kong and Kowloon Labour Unions
| 1,339 || 0.12 || 0.12 || 1 || 1 || 0
|-
|style="background-color: #004DA2"|
| style="text-align:left;" | New Territories General Chamber of Commerce
| 818 || 0.07 || - || 1 || 0 || -
|-
|style="background-color: "|
| style="text-align:left;" | New Century Forum
|  543 || 0.05 || 0.03 || 1 || 0 || 0
|-
| width=1px style="background-color: " |
| style="text-align:left;" |Hong Kong Civic Association
| 390 || 0.03 || - || 5 || 0 || -
|-
| width=1px style="background-color: " |
| style="text-align:left;" | Independents
| 226,645 || 19.91 || - || 161 || 118 || 
|- style="background-color:Pink"
| colspan=3 style="text-align:left;" | Total for pro-Beijing camp|| 614,621 || 53.98 || 7.38 || 430 || 273 || 61
|-
| style="background-color:lightgreen;border-bottom-style:hidden;" rowspan="12"|
| width=1px style="background-color: " |
| style="text-align:left;" |Democratic Party
| 175,054 || 15.38 || 5.90 || 110 || 59 || 21
|-
| width=1px style="background-color: " |
| style="text-align:left;" |Hong Kong Association for Democracy and People's Livelihood
| 52,386 || 4.60 || 0.46 || 37	|| 17 || 7
|-
| width=1px style="background-color: " |
| style="text-align:left;" |Civic Party
| 48,837 || 4.29 || - || 41 || 8 || 2
|-
| width=1px style="background-color: " |
| style="text-align:left;" |League of Social Democrats
| 28,601 || 2.51 || - || 29 || 6 || 0
|-
| width=1px style="background-color: " |
| style="text-align:left;" |Neighbourhood and Worker's Service Centre
| 12,565 || 1.10 || 0.24 || 5 || 4 || 0
|-
|style="background-color: "|
| style="text-align:left;" |Frontier
| 18,203 || 1.60 || 0.81 || 15 || 3 || 3
|-
| width=1px style="background-color: " |
| style="text-align:left;" |Yuen Long Tin Shui Wai Democratic Alliance
| 9,530 || 0.84 || 0.04 || 11 || 1 || 4
|-
| width=1px style="background-color: " |
| style="text-align:left;" |Hong Kong Confederation of Trade Unions
| 2,273 || 0.20 || 0.18 || 2 || 0 || 2
|-
| width=1px style="background-color: " |
| style="text-align:left;" |Civic Act-up
| 991 || 0.09 || 0.40 || 2 || 0 || 2
|-
| width=1px style="background-color: " |
| style="text-align:left;" | Individuals
| 60,510 || 5.31 || - || 44 || 10 || -
|- style="background-color:#E9E9E9"
| colspan=2 style="text-align:left;" | Total for Democratic Coalition for DC Election|| 409,573 || 35.97 || - || 296 || 108 || -
|-
| width=1px style="background-color: " |
| style="text-align:left;" | Independent democrats and others
|  36,208 || 3.18 || - || 39 || 19  || -
|- style="background-color:lightGreen"
| colspan=3 style="text-align:left;" | Total for pan-democracy camp || 445,781 || 39.15 || 5.51 ||	335 || 127 || 56 
|- style="background-color:#DDDDDD;"
| colspan=3 style="text-align:left;" |Independent and others
|   78,133 ||	6.86 || 2.21 || 142 || 5 || -
|-
|style="text-align:left;background-color:#E9E9E9" colspan="3"|Total (turnout 38.83%)
|width="75" style="text-align:right;background-color:#E9E9E9"| 1,138,358  
|width="30" style="text-align:right;background-color:#E9E9E9"|100.0
|style="text-align:right;background-color:#E9E9E9"|-
|style="text-align:right;background-color:#E9E9E9"|907
|style="text-align:right;background-color:#E9E9E9"|405
|style="text-align:right;background-color:#E9E9E9"|5
|}

Results by district

Vote summary

Seat summary

Overview
Without a major political issue like the last election in 2003, the voter turnout significantly dropped about six percentage point to only about 38%, although a total of 1.4 million voters cast their ballots, 80,000 more than the last elections. A total number of 886 candidates contesting in 364 seats, while 41 seats were without contest.

The Democratic Alliance for the Betterment and Progress of Hong Kong (DAB) received the largest victory in its history by winning 115 seats, nearly double than the 2003 results. The party vice-chairman Ip Kwok-him who lost to Cyd Ho in 2003 in his Kwun Lung constituency retook his seat by large margin. Kenny Lee Kwun-yee received a large number of votes in Tai Fat Hau, defeating pro-democratic candidate Ivy Chan Siu-ping of the Civic Act-up. Incumbent legislators Choy So-yuk, Li Kwok-ying and Wong Yung-kan all retained their seats in Kam Ping, Tai Po Market and Po Nga respectively.

The pan-democrats suffered a devastating defeat in the election. The Democratic Party was beaten in every region especially in Kowloon, losing almost half of the seats as compared to the 2003 elections. Veteran Chan Ka-wai in Whampoa East was ousted by Priscilla Leung, a pro-Beijing law scholar at the City University of Hong Kong backed by the Hong Kong Federation of Trade Unions (FTU). In Sheung Shun, incumbent Law Chun-ngai was defeated by Fu Pik-chun of the DAB by 1,220 votes. Former Democratic Party secretary Cheung Yin-tung also lost his seat in Wang King to DAB newcomer Yiu Kwok-wai by 1,321 to 1,684 votes.

The Civic Party failed to challenge the pro-Beijing candidates, winning only 8 seats out of 41 candidates. The party's rising star Yu Kwun-wai lost in a large margin to DAB's Bernard Chan in Ping Shek, while Civic legislator Mandy Tam lost her seat to Choi Luk-sing in Lung Sing. The Hong Kong Association for Democracy and People's Livelihood (ADPL) who had stronghold in Sham Shui Po also saw its candidate Leung Kam-tao lost his seat in Yau Yat Tsuen to pro-Beijing independent Jimmy Kwok Chun-wah. Richard Tsoi of the Hong Kong Confederation of Trade Unions (CTU) who took the seat in Fo Tan in 2003 failed to retain his seat, being beaten by Scarlet Pong Oi-lan of the New Century Forum.

Aftermath
In December 2007, Chief Executive Donald Tsang named 102 government-appointed Council members, of which all of them had pro-government background and one-fifth of them were members of the Democratic Alliance for the Betterment and Progress of Hong Kong (DAB) and the Liberal Party. 15 of them were appointed for the third time. Tsang was criticised for not appointing a single member of the pan-democrats.

References

 
2007 elections in China
2007 in Hong Kong
2007
November 2007 events in China